Paul George Vincent O'Shaughnessy Horgan (August 1, 1903 – March 8, 1995) was an American writer of historical fiction and non-fiction who mainly wrote about the Southwestern United States. He was the recipient of two Pulitzer Prizes for History.

Historian David McCullough wrote of Horgan in 1989: "With the exception of Wallace Stegner, no living American has so distinguished himself in both fiction and history."

Biography
Paul Horgan was born in Buffalo, New York on August 1, 1903.  After his father contracted tuberculosis, the family moved in 1915 to Albuquerque, New Mexico for health reasons. Horgan attended New Mexico Military Institute in Roswell, New Mexico, where he formed a lifelong friendship with classmate and future artist Peter Hurd. In 1922, Horgan befriended physicist J. Robert Oppenheimer in 1922 during a visit to New Mexico.  After finishing high school, Horgan spent a year working for a local newspaper.

In 1923, Horgan enrolled in the Eastman School of Music in Rochester, New York, but dropped out after the first year.  He worked for the next three years in Rochester as the set designer for a new opera company being started by tenor Vladimir Rosing. Although Horgan had never designed sets before, he convinced Rosing to give him the job. The fledgling opera company later became the American Opera Company.

In 1924, Horgan returned to Albuquerque.  He published his first novel, The Fault of Angels, about his experiences in Rochester in 1933; it won the Harper Prize.  He continued to write 17 novels plus other works over the next five decades. Horgan served as president of the American Catholic Historical Association

During World War II, Horgan moved to Washington, D.C. to serve as the head of the Army Information Branch of the US War Department. He would eventually receive the Legion of Merit and be promoted to lieutenant colonel.  He received a Guggenheim Fellowship in 1947.  In 1955, Horgan won the Pulitzer Prize for History and the Bancroft Prize for history with Great River: The Rio Grande in North American History, a history of the Rio Grande River in Mexico and the United States.

In 1959, Horgan became a fellow at the Center for Advanced Studies (CAS)at Wesleyan University in Middletown, Connecticut. Over the next 35 years, he would serve as a director of CAS, an adjunct professor of English, and as a professor emeritus and permanent author-in-residence. The author Charles Barber served as a personal assistant to Horgan when Barber was a college student.  During this period, Horgan also taught seminars and workshops at Yale University and the University of Iowa.

In 1976, Horgan won the Pulitzer Prize for History for Lamy of Santa Fe (Wesleyan University Press), a biography of Archbishop Jean-Baptiste Lamy.

Horgan published 40 books and received 19 honorary degrees from universities in the United States. He received a papal knighthood from Pope Pius XII. Paul Horgan died at Middlesex County Hospital in Middletown, Connecticut, on March 8, 1995.

Literary works
In 1970, Horgan started his "Heroic Triad" of novels, about the different cultures in the Southwest, with the publication of Whitewater. It was followed by Thin Mountain Air in 1977 and Mexico Bay in 1982.

One of Horgan's most popular works was A Distant Trumpet,  a historical novel based on the Apache wars in the Southwest.    Horgan's 1972 book Encounters With Stravinsky, a biography of composer Igor Stravinsky, was called "an utterly irresistible book" by New York Times reviewer Simon Karlinsky. In 1960, author Robert Franklin Gish praised Horgan's literary contributions in the monograph Paul Horgan: Yankee Plainsman and a few other works.

Fiction
The Fault of Angels (1933)
No Quarter Given (1935)
The Return of the Weed (1936) short stories
Main Line West (1936)
A Lamp on the Plains (1937)
Far from Cibola (1938)
The Habit of Empire (1939)
Figures in the Landscape (1940)
The Common Heart (1942)
Devil in the Desert (1950)
Things As They Are (1951)
One Red Rose for Christmas (1952)
The Saintmaker's Christmas Eve (1955) (translated into German by Annemarie Böll as "Weihnachtsabend in San Cristobal")
Give Me Possession (1957)
A Distant Trumpet (1960)
Mountain Standard Time (1962) contains Main Line West, Far from Cibola, and The Common Heart
Toby and the Nighttime (1963) juvenile
Memories of the Future (1966)
The Peach Stone: Stories from Four Decades (1967) short stories
Everything to Live For (1968)
Whitewater (1970)
The Thin Mountain Air (1977)
Mexico Bay (1982)
The Clerihews of Paul Horgan (1985) light verse
The Richard Trilogy (1990) contains Things As they Are, Everything to Live For, and The Thin Mountain Air

Nonfiction
Men of Arms (1931)
From the Royal City (1936)
New Mexico's Own Chronicle (with historian Maurice Garland Fulton) (1937)
Diary and Letters of Josiah Gregg, 1840-1847 (1941)
Look at America: The Southwest (1947)
Great River: The Rio Grande in North American History (1951)
The Centuries of Santa Fe (1956)
Rome Eternal (1959)
Citizen of New Salem (1961)
Conquistadors in North American History (1963)
Songs After Lincoln (1965)
Peter Hurd: A Portrait Sketch from Life (1965) about the painter Peter Hurd
Maurice Baring Restored (editor) (1969) about the poet Maurice Baring
The Heroic Triad. Essays in the Social Energies of Three Southwestern Cultures (1970)
Encounters with Stravinsky (1972) about the composer Igor Stravinsky
Approaches to Writing (1974)
Lamy of Santa Fe: His Life and Times (1975) about Archbishop Jean-Baptiste Lamy
Josiah Gregg and His Vision of the Early West (1979) about the explorer Josiah Gregg
Henriette Wyeth (1980) about the painter Henriette Wyeth
On the Climate of Books (1981) essays
Of America: East & West (1984)
Under the Sangre de Cristo (1985)
A Certain Climate (1988) essays
A Writer's Eye (1988)
Tracings: A Book of Partial Portraits (1993)

Notes

External links
Columbia Electronic Encyclopedia entry
excerpt from A Literary History of the American West by Robert Franklin Gish
American Catholic Historical Association – Past Presidents and Vice-Presidents
BookFinder4U.com's entry on Paul Horgan: Yankee Plainsman

Paul Horgan Papers. Yale Collection of American Literature, Beinecke Rare Book and Manuscript Library.

1903 births
1995 deaths
Eastman School of Music alumni
Writers from Buffalo, New York
Pulitzer Prize for History winners
Catholic University of America people
Wesleyan University faculty
Laetare Medal recipients
20th-century American historians
20th-century American novelists
20th-century American short story writers
American male novelists
American male short story writers
20th-century American male writers
Novelists from Connecticut
Novelists from New York (state)
American male non-fiction writers
Historians from New York (state)
Bancroft Prize winners